Carlo Solveni (August 12, 1897 – June 28, 1983) was an Italian bobsledder who competed in the 1930s. He won a bronze medal in the two-man event at the 1935 FIBT World Championships in Igls. At the 1936 Winter Olympics in Garmisch-Partenkirchen, Solveni finished tenth in the four-man event and 12th in the two-man event.

References

1936 bobsleigh two-man results
1936 bobsleigh four-man results
Bobsleigh two-man world championship medalists since 1931
Carlo Soldini's profile at Sports Reference.com

Olympic bobsledders of Italy
Bobsledders at the 1936 Winter Olympics
Italian male bobsledders
1897 births
1983 deaths